Justin Hood (born 29 April 1993) is a professional English darts player.

Career
In October 2019, Hood reached the Last 32 of the World Masters. He has qualified for the 2020 BDO World Darts Championship as one of the Playoff Qualifiers, he defeated former finalist Jeff Smith and Craig Venman to secure his place in the tournament. He beat Gabriel Pascaru in the preliminary round, before losing 3–1 to Richard Veenstra in the last 32.

Currently participating in the PDC Challenge tour, after the first weekend Happy Feet is joint 16th on the rankings, while also getting to the Semi Finals on Tournament 1 of the weekend.

Justin has been selected to play for England in the up-and-coming international games.

World Championship results

BDO
 2020: First round (lost to Richard Veenstra 1–3)

References

External links
 

Living people
English darts players
1993 births
Professional Darts Corporation associate players
People from Glastonbury